Torkel Halvorsen Aschehoug (27 June 1822 – 20 January 1909) was a prominent Norwegian professor, legal scholar, historian and social economist. He also served  as a conservative politician and Member of the Norwegian Parliament.

Biography
Torkel Halvorsen Aschehoug was born at Idd (now Halden) in Østfold, Norway. He grew up in a professional family in which his father and grandfather  were both parish priests. He attended Fredrikshalds lærde skole in Halden. In 1839, he  entered Royal Frederick University (now University of Oslo), where he later became a professor. In 1844, Aschehoug graduated with a law degree. He subsequently studied abroad with stops including England and Sweden.

In 1852, Aschehoug began an over fifty-year career at the University of Oslo. He was Professor of Jurisprudence, National Economics and Statistics at the Faculty of Law (1862–1889), and also served as the Dean of the Faculty of Law and the elected Chairman of the Collegium Academicum (the governing body of the university).

He also served as a Member of Parliament 1868–1892 and played a central role in the controversy surrounding the adoption of a parliamentary system in which the Cabinet was responsible to parliament instead of being merely appointed by the King. In 1883, he founded Statsøkonomisk Forening, an association to advance the study and understanding of socio-economic issues.

His major works include Norges offentlige ret and Norges nuværende statsforfatning.

He was elected as a member of the Royal Swedish Academy of Sciences in 1890 and received the Grand Cross of the Order of St. Olav in 1895.
In 1908, he received Norway's highest civilian award, the Borgerdådsmedal in gold.

Selected  Works 
 Norges offentlige ret (4 volumes, 1866–1885)
 Part I Statsforfatningen i Norge og Danmark indtil 1814 (Christiania 1866)
 Part II Norges nuværende Statsforfatning (3 volumes, 1874–1881)
 Den nordiske Statsret (1885)
 Das Staatsrecht der vereinigten Königreiche Schweden und Norwegen (1886)
 Norges nuværende statsforfatning (2nd edition. 3 volumes, 1891–1893)
 De norske Communers Retsforfatning før 1837 (1897)
 Socialøkonomik (3 volumes, 1903–08)

Personal life
Torkel Halvorsen Aschehoug  was married twice; 1) Anna Cathrine Marie Aschehoug (1822-1854) 2) Johanne Bolette Aschehoug (1832–1904).
He was the father of Halvard Aschehoug (1851-1880), who together with his cousin Hieronymus Aschehoug (1846–1902), co-founder of H. Aschehoug & Co.

References

Related Reading
Mathilde C. Fasting (2013)  Torkel Aschehoug and Norwegian Historical Economic Thought (Anthem Press)

External links 
 

1909 deaths
1822 births
People from Halden
University of Oslo alumni
Academic staff of the Faculty of Law, University of Oslo
Philosophers of law
Norwegian legal scholars
Norwegian economists
Members of the Storting
Members of the Royal Swedish Academy of Sciences
Recipients of the St. Olav's Medal